The Irish Taxi Council is a union for full-time taxicab drivers in Ireland.

Protests

During March 2010, members of the ITC staged protests over the number of taxi licences. Dublin's O'Connell Street was blockaded for several hours in October 2009 and March 2010

References

Trade unions in the Republic of Ireland